Audrey Lynn Kitching (born July 26, 1985) is an American fashion blogger, model, and fashion designer, known for her "pink hair and Lisa Frank vibe".

Kitching is the owner and founder of an online New Age store called Crystal Cactus. In February 2019, she became the centre of controversy when The Daily Dot detailed allegations of emotional abuse and fraud directed towards Kitching by a former employee.

Modeling
Kitching was born in Collingswood, New Jersey. She began modeling at 14, after being discovered at a hair salon, initially appearing in newspaper ads. After obtaining a high school GED, she  modeled for aspiring photographer friends, and started her blogging career by posting the images online. She often works as not only a model, but also art director for her photo shoots.

She has been a spokesmodel for designer Jared Gold, the British shoe company Irregular Choice, the Italian shoe brand Kerol D, and Kohl's Vera Wang.  Kitching (who is mostly vegan, except for honey) has appeared in a national Peta2 "Fur Is Dead" campaign, and one of its public service announcement against animal testing in the personal care products industry. In 2013, she was selected to be Karmaloop's Miss KL of the Month, and in April 2014 she appeared in a campaign for a Ray Ban's collection, which was featured by Elle Magazine. She has also appeared in Vogue Italia.

Blogging

Kitching was a style editor for SpinMedia's now-defunct social media and pop culture website Buzznet, working with the company for over 6 years since they first found her LiveJournal blog in 2006.

Design
Kitching has designed several clothing lines and collections, including her own organic, fair trade luxury fashion brand called LUNA, which was inspired by astrology, positive thinking, ancient ideologies, and magic. She collaborated with Milan-based footwear company Kerol D Milano in 2014, designing a 12-piece vegan capsule footwear collection featured in Elle Italia.

In 2010, Kitching was one of the designers chosen to work with H&M for Designers Against AIDS. Coco de Coeur, Kitching's former clothing line, was described by Nylon as "astonishing," earning comparisons to designs by Meadham Kirchhoff and Jeremy Scott.

Energy healing and crystal work
Kitching, the founder and CEO of Crystal Cactus, is a new age practitioner who does astrology reports, energy healing, crystal work, and readings for others. In early 2013, Kitching created Crystal Cactus, a line of new age crystal pendant jewelry, holistic spa treatments, and gifts sold in Urban Outfitters. Kitching also performs aura clearings and chakra and karma balancing.
Public backlash came after Kitching's products were revealed to be purchased from Alibaba.

Personal life
Kitching dated Panic! at the Disco's lead vocalist Brendon Urie in 2005.

References

1985 births
Female models from New Jersey
American fashion designers
American women writers
American bloggers
Writers from Philadelphia
American fashion journalists
Fashion websites
Living people
American women journalists
American women bloggers
Journalists from Pennsylvania
Artists from Philadelphia
21st-century American non-fiction writers
American women fashion designers
21st-century American women writers